Khudian Khas railway station is located in town of Khudian, Pakistan.

See also
 List of railway stations in Pakistan
 Pakistan Railways

References

External links

Railway stations in Kasur District
Railway stations on Lodhran–Raiwind Line